Sepulveda station is a station on the G Line of the Los Angeles Metro Busway system. It is named after nearby Sepulveda Boulevard, which travels north-south and crosses the east-west busway route. Unique among G Line stations, Sepulveda's platforms are not located at the cross street, but rather about a block west of it. The station is in the Van Nuys neighborhood of the City of Los Angeles, in the central San Fernando Valley.

Property development
Various development proposals have been considered for the excess station parking and adjacent commercial parcels between Sepulveda Boulevard on the east, the transit station on the south, Interstate 405 on the west, and the Victory Park neighborhood to the north. A comprehensive study, including conceptual land usage strategies, was prepared for LA Metro by students of the UCLA Department of Urban Planning in mid-2010. Subsequently, conceptual development guidelines for the site were prepared by Metro.

Thus far, a development project including an LA Fitness is built on land formerly housing a Wickes Furniture building. Between December 2011 and February 2012, the former Wickes Furniture building was demolished for this project. By October 2012, the LADWP has put up new wooden and metal power poles along Sepulveda Blvd next to the project. The LA Fitness building was built and opened to the public in March 2013.

By 2014 and 2015, most of the Sepulveda Station parking lot is now leased to the Keyes car dealerships that are on Van Nuys Blvd for inventory stock.

By fall 2019, and spring 2020, Metro will begin construction on a bridge over Sepulveda Boulevard as part of the improvements of the Metro G Line busway to reduce travel times. What started so far on the construction of the elevated bridge is that LADWP has put up new power poles at Sepulveda and G Line for undergrounding the existing power lines at the intersection before the construction of the bridge's framework. When the new bridge is constructed, the existing Sepulveda station will be relocated on top of the bridge as an elevated station.

During the 2028 Summer Olympics, the station will serve spectators traveling to and from events at the Sepulveda Dam. A new transfer to the Sepulveda Pass Transit Corridor is expectected to be constructed here as part of that project.

Service

Station Layout

Hours and frequency

Connections 
, the following connections are available:
 Los Angeles Metro Bus:

Station artwork 

The platform features a painting that shows a pre-Columbian glyph and a map of the monarch butterfly's migratory path.

References

External links

G Line (Los Angeles Metro)
Van Nuys, Los Angeles
Los Angeles Metro Busway stations
Public transportation in the San Fernando Valley
Public transportation in Los Angeles
Bus stations in Los Angeles
2005 establishments in California